David Fox (born 30 December 1950, in Los Angeles) is an American multimedia producer who designed and programmed numerous early LucasArts games. He and his wife, Annie Fox, now work on educational software, web design, emotional intelligence content, online communities, emerging technologies, and writing books for children and teens.

Early work
Fox is based in the San Francisco Bay Area. At age eleven, he made his first 8 mm cartoon using stacks of discarded Flintstones cels he found in the trash bins behind Hanna-Barbera. He studied engineering at UCLA and Humanistic Psychology at Sonoma State University, where he received his bachelor's degree. Fox and his wife Annie co-founded Marin Computer Center in 1977 - the world's first public-access microcomputer center. He co-authored the books Computer Animation Primer, Armchair BASIC, and Pascal Primer.

LucasArts
His books led to him being hired as a founding member of the Games Division at Lucasfilm (later renamed LucasArts). Over the next ten years, he was the designer, project leader, and one of the programmers for the games Rescue on Fractalus!, Labyrinth, Zak McKracken and the Alien Mindbenders and Indiana Jones and the Last Crusade: The Graphic Adventure. He also worked on Maniac Mansion as the primary script programmer. Fox was part of the memorable team that included Ron Gilbert and Noah Falstein.

He spent his last two years at LucasArts as Manager of Entertainment Software on Mirage (a collaboration between LucasArts and Hughes Aircraft Corporation). This multi-player, networked location-based entertainment system was intended for theme parks, but like several early Lucasfilm projects of the time, was too advanced and hence too expensive for the market at that time.

Talk City
After leaving LucasArts, Fox was a Senior Game Designer at Rocket Science Games, then worked as a freelance consultant on several games. In 1996, he joined LiveWorld Inc./Talk City, an Internet community provider, as their Director of Kids and Entertainment Programming. During his four years at the company, he produced The InSite, a website for teen empowerment, and then became the Director of New Content.

In 2001, he returned to immersive gaming at Xulu Entertainment, producing their motion simulator project. He produced and designed a prototype of an educational game for Learning Friends under a grant from the William and Flora Hewlett Foundation.

Recent and current work
In the run-up to the 2004 Democratic primaries, Fox was active on Howard Dean's Media Team (responsible for Switch2Dean.com) and built a blog for Simon & Schuster on Dean's book, Winning Back America.

Since then, Fox has developed websites for authors David McCullough and Terry Gamble, Alaska Federation of Natives and Marin Democrats, all with graphic designer Daniel Will-Harris.

From 2005 to 2011, he was the Director of Production for NewsTrust, a citizen news rating service aiming to bring together experienced journalists and volunteer reviewers.

He currently designs apps for the iTunes App Store. His most recent game is Rube Works: The Official Rube Goldberg Invention Game, the first Rube Goldberg game authorized by The Heirs of Rube Goldberg.

Fox, along with Ron Gilbert and Gary Winnick, was involved in the programming, scripting and writing of the adventure game Thimbleweed Park, which was released in March 2017.

In 2022, Fox was the lead gameplay programmer on Return to Monkey Island, the sixth installment of the Monkey Island franchise.

LucasArts and Scumm 
 LucasArts adventure games
 SCUMM
 ScummVM

Games 
1984 Rescue on Fractalus!
1986 Labyrinth: The Computer Game
1987 Maniac Mansion
1988 Zak McKracken and the Alien Mindbenders
1989 Indiana Jones and the Last Crusade: The Graphic Adventure
1989 Pipe Dream
1994 Cadillacs and Dinosaurs: The Second Cataclysm
2014 Rube Works: The Official Rube Goldberg Invention Game
2017 Thimbleweed Park
2020 Delores A Thimbleweed Park Mini-Adventure
2022 Return to Monkey Island

References

External links
 Official site
 Thimbleweed Park team
 Cartoon Free America
 IMDB: David Fox (VIII)
 Computer Animation Primer scanned copy of book
 David Fox at La Isla del Mono (Spanish)
 Interview with David Fox about his work for Lucasfilm Games (from Halcyon Days: Interviews with Classic Computer and Video Game Programmers)
 Two-part interview with David Fox in 2011 about the formation of the Lucasfilm Games Group, development of Rescue on Fractalus! as well as his modern work in theme parks and educational media
 Interview with David Fox from 2013 and 2014

American video game designers
American video game programmers
Living people
Lucasfilm people
Sonoma State University alumni
1950 births